The Lammermoor Range is a range of rugged hills in Central Otago, in southern New Zealand.

The range runs for approximately 30 kilometres northeast from the Lammerlaw Range before reaching the Sutton Salt Lake, which separates it from the southern end of the Rock and Pillar Range southwest of Middlemarch. The young Taieri River flows through the range and along its northwest flank.

The range was named for the Lammermuir Hills in south east Scotland, possibly influenced by the spelling of Walter Scott's novel The Bride of Lammermoor, which is set in those hills.

The Lammermoor Range was the designated site for Project Hayes, a giant controversial wind farm proposal which was abandoned in 2012.

The Lammermoor Range is one of only two sites where the Nationally Endangered Burgan skink has previously been found.

References

Mountain ranges of Otago